The System of Objects is a 1968 book by the sociologist Jean Baudrillard. The book is based on the Baudrillard's doctoral thesis under the dissertation committee of Henri Lefebvre, Roland Barthes, and Pierre Bourdieu.

Content
In his early books, such as The System of Objects, For a Critique of the Political Economy of the Sign, and The Consumer Society, Baudrillard's main focus is upon consumerism, and how different objects are consumed in different ways. At this time Baudrillard's political outlook was loosely associated with Marxism (and situationism), but in these books he differed from Karl Marx in one significant way. For Baudrillard, as for the situationists, it was consumption rather than production that was the main driver of capitalist society.

References

1968 non-fiction books
Books by Jean Baudrillard
Books in philosophy of technology
French non-fiction books
Non-fiction books about consumerism
Philosophy books